The Aerosport Rail is an American minimalist ultralight aircraft, designed by Harris Woods and built by Aerosport Inc. The aircraft was first flown on 14 November 1970.

Design and development
The Rail is little more than a 2 by 5 inch squared aluminium tube (rail) with all-metal wings and a T-tail. The pilot sits on the tube, just ahead of and above the wings. Individual  fiberglass fuel tanks are mounted in front of each engine. About 175 sets of plans were sold between 1970 and 1977. The follow-on design, the Aerosport Quail uses the Rail's wing design for an enclosed tractor configuration homebuilt aircraft.

Specifications

See also

References

 
 Aerofiles
The FLYING RAIL: A Twin-Engine Pusher You Can Build, by Ben Kocivar,  Popular Science, Oct. 1971, pp. 55 ff.

Rail
Homebuilt aircraft
1970s United States ultralight aircraft
Low-wing aircraft
Twin-engined pusher aircraft
Aircraft first flown in 1970
T-tail aircraft